Atelopus peruensis is a species of toad in the family Bufonidae.
It is endemic to Peru.
Its natural habitats are subtropical or tropical high-altitude grassland and rivers.

References

Sources
 

peruensis
Amphibians of Peru
Amphibians of the Andes
Endemic fauna of Peru
Amphibians described in 1985
Taxonomy articles created by Polbot